Nadina is a genus of acoels. It is the only genus in the monotypic family Nadinidae.

Species
There are three species recognised in the genus Nadina.

References

Acoelomorphs
Monogeneric animal families